Penstemon scariosus is a species of flowering plant in the plantain family known by the common name White River beardtongue. It is native to Colorado, Utah, and Wyoming in the United States.

There are four varieties of this species, including var. albifluvis (White River beardtongue), var. cyanomontanus (Neese's Blue Mountain beardtongue), and var. garrettii (Garrett's beardtongue). The var. albifluvis is a rare variety limited to northeastern Utah and northwestern Colorado. It is up to 30 centimeters tall and produces lavender or light blue flowers. The flowers are pollinated by bees. This variety is a candidate for federal protection because it grows on oil shale, a common source of petroleum.

References

scariosus
Flora of Colorado
Flora of Utah
Flora of Wyoming